Alirezavandi or Ali Rezavandi may refer to:
Alirezavandi, Gilan-e Gharb
Alirezavandi, Govar